The strike cruiser (proposed hull designator: CSGN) was a proposal from DARPA for a class of cruisers in the late 1970s.

A prototype strike cruiser was to be the refurbished ; at a cost of roughly $800 million, however this never came to pass.

Originally, eight to twelve strike cruisers were projected. Plagued with design difficulties and escalating cost, the project was canceled in the closing days of the Ford administration.

See also
 Arsenal ship
 DD21
 CG(X)
  (CGN-42 variant)
 
 
 Cruiser Baseline
 List of cruisers of the United States Navy

Notes

External links
 Letters to Antiwar.com
 Strike Cruiser (CSGN)- GlobalSecurity.org
 Statement by Ronald O'Rourke before the House Armed Services Committee, 6 April 2006
 CSGN-1 "Strike Cruiser" class - Harpoon HQ
 Shipbucket.com:
 USS Long Beach CSGN Refit 
 CGN-42-class CSGN 
 CGN-42-class CSGN 
 1974 CSGN 
 1974 CSGN 
 1976 CSGN 
 Photobucket - Shipbucket:
 USS Long Beach CSGN Refit
 Virginia-class CSGN
 Virginia-class CSGN
 1974 CSGN
 1974 CSGN
 1976 CSGN
 CSGN Chart

Ship types
Cancelled ships of the United States Navy
Cold War cruisers of the United States